Defending champions Stéphane Houdet and Nicolas Peifer defeated Frédéric Cattaneo and Stefan Olsson in the final, 6–1, 7–6(7–5) to win the men's doubles wheelchair tennis title at the 2018 French Open.

Seeds

Draw

Finals

References
 Draw

Wheelchair Men's Doubles
French Open, 2018 Men's Doubles